Gaylord Texan Resort & Convention Center is an American hotel and convention center, opened in Grapevine, Texas 30 minutes from Dallas - Fort Worth, on April 4, 2004. It has  of meeting space and 1,814 guest rooms.

Gaylord Texan is owned by Ryman Hospitality Properties (formerly known as Gaylord Entertainment Company), and operated by Marriott International. It is a sister hotel to the Gaylord Opryland Resort & Convention Center, Gaylord National Resort & Convention Center, and Gaylord Palms Resort & Convention Center.

In 2004, 2005, 2009, 2017 and 2018 it was the location of QuakeCon, a gaming convention based in Texas.

The resort hosted the National Conference of the Technology Student Association from June 28, 2015, through July 2, 2015 and 2022 National TSA Competition. 

The Glass Cactus nightclub located at the hotel was named one of Billboard magazine's 25 Hottest Clubs in North America in 2012.

Annual events 
The resort features an annual event with different themes each year. The event is called ICE! and Lone Star Christmas and is sponsored by different corporations every year. Each annual exhibit is a different holiday theme such as Charlie Brown, Nutcracker, Shrek, and Frosty the Snowman.

References

External links 
Gaylord Texan Official Website
Event space
 

Hotels in Texas
Gaylord Hotels
Buildings and structures in Tarrant County, Texas
Tourist attractions in Tarrant County, Texas